Ophthalmis darna is a moth of the family Noctuidae first described by Herbert Druce in 1894. It is found on Timor, an island at the southern end of Maritime Southeast Asia.

References

Moths described in 1894
Agaristinae